Khooni Mahal is a 1987 Bollywood horror film directed by Mohan Bhakri. It is a pornographic Hindi horror film. It was the first film of its kind of Bollywood where unknown naked female was picturised without being censored having sex with Raza Murad, Javed Khan and Kiran were the lead actors. Neelam Mehra gave some hot scenes which was later censored.

Plot 
In a village, at one night the landlord Jagira is affected by ghost soul and starts killing villagers. The village had a well established people but after incidence Jagira beaten to death by villagers, villagers left the village. Jagira at deathbed vows to take revenge those who will reside in his residence. After few years of this incidence, a newly married couple are traveling near by takes shelter at this residence. The couple is killed by the angry ghost of Jagira who is now turned into a bad soul.

Cast 
 Raj Kiran
 Raza Murad
 Hussein Khan
 Jagdeep
 Shoma Anand
 Neelam Mehra
 Huma Khan
 Madhu Malhotra
 Abhijeet Sen
 Satish Kaul
 Anu Dhawan

Soundtrack
"Jalta Hai Tan" - N/A
"Main To Hungama Kar Loonga" - Vinod Rathod
"Maine Dil Tumko Diya Tune Dil Mujhko Diya" - Anuradha Paudwal, Mohammed Aziz

References

External links
 

1987 films
Films scored by Nadeem–Shravan
1980s Hindi-language films
Films about landlords